Franklyn B Paverty is an Australian bush band that has performed mostly in and around Canberra.

It has entertained audiences with its repertoire of predominantly Australian folk music, bush ballads and music for bush dances) varied occasionally with material from the celtic, bluegrass and old-time traditions.

The band has made numerous albums, TV appearances and radio broadcasts and it played for the official opening of Australia's new Parliament House, Canberra in 1988; and again at celebrations marking the 10th anniversary in 1998, the 20th anniversary in 2008 and the 25th anniversary in 2013.

Over the years, the band has shared the stage with Billy Connolly, The Dubliners, The Hollies, Gerry and the Pacemakers, Slim Dusty and Eric Bogle.

Band members over the years included Dave Chalker, Graham Chalker, Bryan Rae, Mal Bennett, Tom Breen, Mark Tandy, Ros Haskew, Fiona Mahoney, Dave O'Neill, Donal Baylor, Frank and Bernie Nizynski, Mike Jackson, John Warner, Bob Buckley, Peter Hobson, Peter Logue, Simone Dawson, Mary Firkins and John Taylor.

Discography

Studio albums

References

See also
And the Band Played Waltzing Matilda

Australian Capital Territory musical groups